Central Cumberland, an electoral district of the Legislative Assembly in the Australian state of New South Wales was created in 1859 and abolished in 1894.


Election results

Elections in the 1890s

1893 by-election

1891 by-election

1891

Elections in the 1880s

September 1889 by-election

June 1889 by-election

1889

May 1888 by-election

March 1888 by-election

1887 by-election

1887

1885

1885 by-election

1882

1880

Elections in the 1870s

1877

1877 by-election

1875 by-election

1874-75

1872

Elections in the 1860s

1869-70

1868 by-election

1867 by-election

1864-65

1863 by-election

1860

Elections in the 1850s

1859

Notes

References

New South Wales state electoral results by district